Kogh Vasil, or Vasil the Robber (died on 12 October 1112), was the Armenian ruler of Raban and Kaisun at the time of the First Crusade.

Biography

In the early 12th century, Kogh Vasil was the most influential Armenian ruler who adhered to the Armenian Apostolic Church. He was a major power in the reason and had vassals such as Ablgharib, lord of al-Bira. Although Kogh seems to have been from humble origins, he claimed the heritage and authority of the Armenian kingdom through his wife, who according to Matthew of Edessa was descendent from the Kamsarakan family. Finally, he also became a protector of the Pahlavuni Armenian Patriarchs and Gregory II took up residence in Kaisun at some time before he died in 1106.

Kogh's brother was Bagrat who influenced Baldwin of Boulogne to depart from the army of the First Crusade and venture into the Armenian controlled lands. Once Baldwin and Bagrat fell out, he was forced to submit to their rule and Baldwin's brother Godfrey seized one of his fortresses. Nevertheless, he seems to have arranged with the Franks and been instrumental in arranging the ransom for Bohemond of Taranto when he captured by the Danishmendids, later even adopting him.

He was succeeded by his adopted son, Vasil Dgha, under whose rule the principality of Kogh Vasil fell apart.

References

Sources

 

 
 

11th-century Armenian people
Medieval Armenian generals
11th-century Byzantine people
1112 deaths
Armenian Apostolic Christians